Two Roads Picture Co. is an American independent film production company founded in 2016 by Charleene Closshey and Jeremy Culver. It produced and released the first film in history able to be streamed for cryptocurrency using blockchain technology, the company's first feature film titled No Postage Necessary.

History 

The Florida incorporated company began in 2016 Closshey and Culver co-produced the 2018 film No Postage Necessary. For the blockchain debut, the company partnered with decentralized application Vevue, a peer-to-peer incentivized video network built on the QTUM platform and utilizing smart contracts. The company also distributed the film in the United States, screening in select U.S. theaters July 6, 2018 and available digitally online July 10, 2018. In 2018, Two Roads Picture Co. launched a blockchain distribution division of the company headed by Jeremy Culver.

Filmography

References

External links
 Two Roads Picture Co. website

Film production companies of the United States
American companies established in 2016
Mass media companies established in 2016

Blockchain entities